Canoe Wales is the national governing body for paddlesport in Wales. It covers all branches of the sport from recreational canoeing, kayaking, stand up paddleboarding and rafting to whitewater racing, slalom racing and wildwater racing; flatwater sprint racing and marathon racing; canoe sailing; canoe polo; surf kayaking and canoeing; and extreme racing. The organisation has over 2,700 members including individual paddlers as well as affiliated club members. Full adult members of Canoe Wales are also by default Welsh members of British Canoeing.

Canoe Wales' vision is to create an "inclusive and active paddling community in Wales" and its mission is "to inspire and support more people across Wales to go paddling".

History
Formerly known as the Welsh Canoeing Association, it was in the past responsible for the formal access agreements on the Conwy, Glaslyn, Llwyd, Ogwr, Severn, Tawe, Tryweryn, Twrch, Usk and Wye and informal agreements on rivers and managed stillwaters. However, following conflicts of interest, it has disavowed access agreements and begun to seek a legislative solution to access problems hoping for a parallel to the Land Reform (Scotland) Act 2003. It is also responsible for the rights of navigation agreements on sections of the Lugg, Severn and Wye. Canoe Wales organises competition at national and international level in all the canoeing and kayaking disciplines in Wales: freestyle; slalom; wild water racing; marathon racing; sprint racing; surf kayaking; and canoe polo.

Responsibilities
Canoe Wales manages Canolfan Tryweryn, the National Whitewater Centre near Bala, Gwynedd, where the organisation is based. The Afon Tryweryn is a dam released river, allowing water to flow when other rivers are running dry, providing a year-round white water venue.

Canoe Wales is also a supporter of the Clear Access Clear Waters campaign (formerly the Rivers Access Campaign), and has been seeking government approved statutory access to rivers for over 50 years.

References

External links
 Canoe Wales website
Become a member of Canoe Wales
 Canolfan Tryweryn website

Canoeing in Wales
Sports governing bodies in Wales
Canoe organizations
Canoeing in the United Kingdom